Only 1 of the 2 Vermont incumbents were re-elected.

Vermont law required a candidate to win a majority to take office, necessitating a run-off election in the 2nd (Eastern) district.

See also 
 List of United States representatives from Vermont
 United States House of Representatives elections, 1800 and 1801

References 

1800
Vermont
United States House of Representatives